Protein dachsous homolog 2, also known as protocadherin-23 (PCDH23) or cadherin-27 (CDH27), is a protein that in humans is encoded by the DCHS2 gene.

DCHS2 has been implicated in the nose angle (how much a nose is upturned). As well as facial genetics

References

Further reading